Compsoctena spilophanes is a moth in the family Eriocottidae. It was described by Edward Meyrick in 1921. It is found in South Africa and Zimbabwe.

The wingspan is 17–18 mm. The forewings are fuscous, somewhat strigulated obscurely with dark fuscous irroration (speckles) and with ten to fifteen variable irregular shining white spots and blotches edged with dark fuscous. The hindwings are dark fuscous.

References

Moths described in 1921
Compsoctena
Lepidoptera of South Africa
Insects of Zimbabwe